The Confederación Centroamericana y del Caribe de Fútbol, also known by its initialism CCCF, was the governing body of association football in Central America and the Caribbean from 1938 to 1961.

Héctor Beeche, the president of the Costa Rican Football Federation was the organization's first president.

In 1961 it merged with the North American Football Confederation (NAFC) to form CONCACAF, the modern continental governing body for North America. It hosted the CCCF Championship from 1941 to 1961.

Members

The membership of CCCF consisted of:

 (Former NAFC member)
 (Later )

Other teams that participated in the competition include:

See also
 North American Football Union (NAFU)
 Central American Football Union (UNCAF)
 Caribbean Football Union (CFU)

References 

 
Defunct association football governing bodies
Association football governing bodies in the Caribbean
Sports organizations established in 1938
1938 establishments in North America
Central America and the Caribbean